Pelochrista umbraculana is a species of moth of the family Tortricidae. It is found in China, Mongolia, Japan and Russia.

The wingspan is 17–23 mm. Adults have been recorded on wing from June to September.

Subspecies
Pelochrista umbraculana umbraculana
Pelochrista umbraculana inignana (Kennel, 1901) (China, Mongolia, Japan, Russia)

References

Moths described in 1844
Eucosmini